The Rider of Death Valley is a 1932 American Western film directed by Albert S. Rogell and written by Jack Cunningham. The film stars Tom Mix, Lois Wilson, Fred Kohler, Forrest Stanley, Edith Fellows and Willard Robertson. The film was released on April 24, 1932, by Universal Pictures.

Cast 
Tom Mix as Tom Rigby
Lois Wilson as Helen Joyce
Fred Kohler as Lew Grant
Forrest Stanley as Doc Larribee
Edith Fellows as Betty Joyce
Willard Robertson as Bill Joyce
Mae Busch as Tillie
Otis Harlan as Peck
Francis Ford as Gabe
Tony the Horse as Tony

References

External links
 

1932 films
1930s English-language films
American Western (genre) films
1932 Western (genre) films
Universal Pictures films
Films directed by Albert S. Rogell
American black-and-white films
1930s American films